All Saints Church, Twickenham, is a Church of England church on Campbell Road in Twickenham in the London Borough of Richmond upon Thames. Its vicar and parish priest is Fr Alex Lane SSC.

As a traditionalist Anglo-Catholic church, the parish receives alternative episcopal oversight from the Bishop of Fulham (currently Jonathan Baker).

The church's building, dating from 1913-14, has been  Grade II listed  since 1986.

References

External links
Official website

Anglo-Catholic church buildings in the London Borough of Richmond upon Thames
Diocese of London
Twickenham
Anglo-Catholic churches in England receiving AEO